Shakti is the primordial cosmic energy and represents the dynamic forces that are thought to move through the entire universe in Hinduism and Shaktism.

Shakti may also refer to:

Films 
 Sakthi (1972 film), an Indian Malayalam film released in 1972 starring V. Ravichandran and Sheela
 Sakthi (1980 film), an Indian Malayalam film released in 1980 starring Jayan and Seema
 Shakti (1982 film), Bollywood film starring Dilip Kumar, Amitabh Bachchan, and Anil Kapoor
 Sakthi (1997 film), 1997 Tamil film
 Shakti (2002 film), Bollywood film starring Karisma Kapoor, Nana Patekar, and Aishwarya Rai
 Shakti (2004 film), a Bengali-language film
 Shakti (2011 film), a Tollywood film starring Ileana D'Cruz
 Shakti (2012 film), a Kannada-language film
 Shakti (2019 film), An Argentine Spanish-language short film
 Prem Shakti (1994 film), Bollywood film starring Govinda, Karishma Kapoor, Kader Khan, and Shakti Kapoor
 Sakthi (TV series), Tamil soap opera

Music 
 Shakti (band), musical group with John McLaughlin and L. Shankar
 Shakti (Shakti album)
 Shakti Records, former music label of Narada Productions
 Shakti (David S. Ware album), a 2009 album by saxophonist David S. Ware

Fiction 
 Shakti (comics), a fictional character published by Raj Comics
 Shakti Haddad, alter ego of Cerebra, fictional superhero in the Marvel Comics universe
 Shakti Kareen, a fictional character from Mobile Suit Victory Gundam
 Shaak Ti, a fictional character in the Star Wars universe

People 
 Shakti Bahadur Basnet (born 1971), Nepalese politician
 Shakti Chattopadhyay (1934–1995), Bengali poet
 Shakti Kapoor (born 1952), Bollywood actor
 Shakti Samanta (1926–2009), Bollywood director and producer
 Shakti Mohan, dancer and actor
 Shakti Raj, Indian politician
 Shakthi (cinematographer), Tamil cinematographer

Places 
 Shakti Peethas, places of worship consecrated to the goddess Shakti

Computing 
 Shakti, open-source RISC-V processor from India
 A Database System by Arthur Whitney (computer scientist).

Other uses 
 Mission Shakti, the anti-satellite missile test conducted by India in 2019
 Operation Shakti, round of nuclear tests conducted by India in 1998

See also
 Shakhty, town in the eastern Donbass area of Russia
 Sakthi (disambiguation)